Hüseynalılar or Hüseynallar may refer to:
 Hüseynalılar, Barda, Azerbaijan
 Hüseynalılar, Jabrayil, Azerbaijan